Magic Mountain Resort is a modest alpine ski area in south central Idaho, in a southern unit of the Sawtooth National Forest.

It has a double chairlift, a poma lift, and a rope tow. The  of skiable terrain is rated at 30% easiest, 25% more difficult, 20% most difficult, and 25% experts only. Magic Mountain also has a snow tubing hill.

Outside of holidays, the ski area is open four days a week, Thursday through Sunday, and does not have night skiing. The area has been operating for over  years.

References

External links
Magic Mountain - official site
Ski Idaho.us  - official state tourism site
Idaho Ski Resorts.com - Magic Mountain
On the Snow.com - Magic Mountain
 Ski Map.org – trail maps – Magic Mountain

Ski areas and resorts in Idaho
Buildings and structures in Twin Falls County, Idaho
Tourist attractions in Twin Falls County, Idaho